Natalie Myburgh (15 May 1940 – 21 January 2014) was a South African swimmer. At the 1954 British Empire and Commonwealth Games in Auckland, Myburgh teamed up with Felicity Loveday, Joan Harrison and Machduldt Petzer to win the 4×110 yards freestyle relay. Two years later at the 1956 Summer Olympics in Melbourne, Myburgh teamed up with Susan Roberts, Moira Abernethy and Jeanette Myburgh to win the 4 × 100 m freestyle relay.

References

1940 births
2014 deaths
South African female freestyle swimmers
South African female swimmers
Olympic swimmers of South Africa
Swimmers at the 1956 Summer Olympics
Swimmers at the 1954 British Empire and Commonwealth Games
Swimmers at the 1958 British Empire and Commonwealth Games
Olympic bronze medalists in swimming
Medalists at the 1956 Summer Olympics
Olympic bronze medalists for South Africa
Commonwealth Games gold medallists for South Africa
Commonwealth Games medallists in swimming
20th-century South African women
21st-century South African women
Medallists at the 1954 British Empire and Commonwealth Games